Pennautier is a commune in the Aude department in southern France.

Population

The inhabitants of the commune are known as Pennautierois in French.

Sights
 Épanchoir de Foucaud
 Canal du Midi

See also
Communes of the Aude department

References

Communes of Aude
Aude communes articles needing translation from French Wikipedia